Dentures Out is the twelfth studio album by Scottish folk rock duo the Proclaimers. It was released on 16 September 2022 on Cooking Vinyl.

Writing and production 
The band stated that coronavirus restrictions in 2020 and 2021 posed a major barrier to the duo's songwriting as the two were unable to get together, and that several songs reflect the melancholy of that period.

Dentures Out was recorded in Wales at Rockfield Studios over a period of three weeks.

Content 
The Irish Times described the record as a "quasi-political manifesto". Dentures Out has been remarked upon for its anti-nostalgia stance. Timothy Monger of AllMusic stated that the record "took aim" at the press for "weaponizing" nostalgia during the COVID-19 pandemic. The duo have stated that the title track, "Dentures Out", is a reflection on the "terminal decline" of Britain.

Reception 
Dentures Out has been described by Louder Than War as showing the band as being "at their sharpest, wittiest, loudest and rocking best" and as a "must-listen".

Track listing

Charts

References 

2022 albums
Cooking Vinyl albums
The Proclaimers albums
Albums recorded at Rockfield Studios